Said Al-Ghazzi (11 June 1893 ‎ – 18 September 1967) was a Syrian lawyer, politician and two time prime minister of Syria. He was born in Damascus.

Early life
Said belonged to the prominent al-Ghazzi family, which was established in Damascus since the 14th century and which historically provided the leadership of the Shafi'i madhhab (school of law) and produced dozens of noted scholars over the centuries. In the late 19th and early 20th century members of the family consistently held a seat in the municipal council and became increasingly involved in politics. Sa'id's great-grandfather Umar was the mufti of the Shafi'is and was considered by a biographer to be the most preeminent of the notables of Damascus in his lifetime. He was implicated in the 1860 massacres of Christians in the city and imprisoned in Cyprus where he died the following year. Sa'id's eponymous grandfather voluntarily accompanied his father Umar but nothing more is heard of him. His son Abd al-Wahab was Sa'id's father.

Political career
A lawyer by occupation, Sa'id entered politics during French rule and following Syria's independence in 1946. He served as the justice minister in 1936, 1945 and 1947. In 1946 he was the finance minister and in 1947 he also served as the national economy minister. In 1954 he was prime minister. The following year he was foreign minister. In 1962 Sa'id served as the president of the Speaker of the People's Assembly of Syria.

His daughter Nadia al-Ghazzi is a lawyer, writer, and TV presenter, and his niece is the poet and artist Huda Naamani.

References

Bibliography

1893 births
1967 deaths
Prime Ministers of Syria
Foreign ministers of Syria
Syrian ministers of justice
Syrian ministers of defense
Syrian ministers of finance
Syrian ministers of Awqaf
Speakers of the People's Assembly of Syria
Politicians from Damascus
20th-century Syrian lawyers
20th-century Syrian politicians
Al-Ghazzi family
Syrian Freemasons